Hüseynqulular is a village in the municipality of Düz Rəsullu in the Gadabay Rayon of Azerbaijan.

References

Populated places in Gadabay District